Drybus  is a village in the administrative district of Gmina Baranów, within Grodzisk Mazowiecki County, Masovian Voivodeship, in east-central Poland.

The village has a population of 183.

References

Drybus